Ibrahima Ndiaye may refer to:

 Ibrahima N'Diaye (born 1948), Malian politician
 Ibrahima Ndiaye (footballer) (born 1998), Senegalese footballer
 Ibrahima Mame N'Diaye (born 1994), Senegalese footballer